Back Again may refer to:

Albums
 Back Again! (Milira album), 1992
 Back Again (Disciple album), 2003, or the title track
 Back Again! (Mr. Cheeks album), 2003
 Back Again (Bob Brookmeyer album), 1978
 Back Again... No Matter What, an album by Boyzone

Songs
 "Back Again" (song), a song by Boy Kill Boy 2006
 "Back Again", a song by Rebel Starr from the Noah's Arc: Jumping the Broom film soundtrack
 "Back Again", a 2008 single by Waldo's People
"Back Again", a 1978 single by Stars
"Back Again", a 1989 single by Chris Norman
"Back Again", a song by Parachute from Losing Sleep